Aztec mythology is the body or collection of myths of the Aztec civilization of Central Mexico. The Aztecs were Nahuatl-speaking groups living in central Mexico and much of their mythology is similar to that of other Mesoamerican cultures.  According to legend, the various groups who were to become the Aztecs arrived from the north into the Anahuac valley around Lake Texcoco. The location of this valley and lake of destination is clear – it is the heart of modern Mexico City – but little can be known with certainty about the origin of the Aztec.  There are different accounts of their origin. In the myth the ancestors of the Mexica/Aztec came from a place in the north called Aztlan, the last of seven nahuatlacas (Nahuatl-speaking tribes, from tlaca, "man") to make the journey southward, hence their name "Azteca." Other accounts cite their origin in Chicomoztoc, "the place of the seven caves," or at Tamoanchan (the legendary origin of all civilizations).

The Mexica/Aztec were said to be guided by their god Huitzilopochtli, meaning "Left-handed Hummingbird" or "Hummingbird from the South." At an island in Lake Texcoco, they saw an eagle holding a rattlesnake in its talons, perched on a nopal cactus. This vision fulfilled a prophecy telling them that they should found their new home on that spot. The Aztecs built their city of Tenochtitlan on that site, building a great artificial island, which today is in the center of Mexico City. This legendary vision is pictured on the Coat of Arms of Mexico.

Creation myth 

According to legend, when the Mexica arrived in the Anahuac valley around Lake Texcoco, they were considered by the other groups as the least civilized of all, but the Mexica/Aztec decided to learn, and they took all they could from other people, especially from the ancient Toltec (whom they seem to have partially confused with the more ancient civilization of  Teotihuacan). To the Aztec, the Toltec were the originators of all culture; "Toltecayotl" was a synonym for culture. Aztec legends identify the Toltecs and the cult of Quetzalcoatl with the legendary city of Tollan, which they also identified with the more ancient Teotihuacan.

Because the Aztec adopted and combined several traditions with their own earlier traditions, they had several creation myths. One of these, the Five Suns, describes four great ages preceding the present world, each of which ended in a catastrophe, and "were named in function of the force or divine element that violently put an end to each one of them". Coatlicue was the mother of Centzon Huitznahua ("Four Hundred Southerners"), her sons, and Coyolxauhqui, her daughter. She found a ball filled with feathers and placed it in her waistband, becoming pregnant with Huitzilopochtli. Her other children became suspicious as to the identity of the father and vowed to kill their mother. She gave birth on Mount Coatepec, pursued by her children, but the newborn Huitzilopochtli defeated most of his brothers, who became the stars. He also killed his half-sister Coyolxauhqui by tearing out her heart using a Xiuhcoatl (a blue snake) and throwing her body down the mountain. This was said to inspire the Aztecs to rip the hearts out of their human sacrifices and throw their bodies down the sides of the temple dedicated to Huitzilopochtli, who represents the sun chasing away the stars at dawn.

Our age (Nahui-Ollin), the fifth age, or fifth creation, began in the ancient city of Teotihuacan. According to the myth, all the gods had gathered to sacrifice themselves and create a new age. Although the world and the sun had already been created, it would only be through their sacrifice that the sun would be set into motion and time as well as history could begin. The most handsome and strongest of the gods, Tecuciztecatl, was supposed to sacrifice himself but when it came time to self-immolate, he could not jump into the fire. Instead, Nanahuatl the smallest and humblest of the gods, who was also covered in boils, sacrificed himself first and jumped into the flames. The sun was set into motion with his sacrifice and time began. Humiliated by Nanahuatl's sacrifice, Tecuciztecatl too leaped into the fire and became the moon.

Pantheon 

 
Water deities
 Tlaloc, god of rain, lightning and thunder. He is a fertility god.
 Chalchiuhtlicue, goddess of running water, lakes, rivers, seas, streams, horizontal waters, storms, and baptism.
 Huixtocihuatl, goddess of salt
 Opochtli, god of fishing and birdcatchers, discoverer of both the harpoon and net
 Atlahua, god of water, a fisherman and archer
Fire deities
 Xiuhtecuhtli, god of fire and time
 Chantico, goddess of firebox and volcanoes
 Xolotl, god of death, associated with Venus as the Evening Star (Double of Quetzalcoatl)
Death deities
 Mictlantecuhtli, god of the dead, ruler of the Underworld (Mictlan)
 Mictecacihuatl, goddess of the dead, ruler of the Underworld (Mictlan)
 Xolotl, god of death, associated with Venus as the Evening Star (Double of Quetzalcoatl)
Sky deities
 Tezcatlipoca, god of providence, the darkness and the invisible, lord of the night, ruler of the North.
 Xipe-Totec, god of force, lord of the seasons and rebirth, ruler of the East.
 Quetzalcoatl, god of the life, the light and wisdom, lord of the winds and the day, ruler of the West.
 Huitzilopochtli, god of war, lord of the sun and fire, ruler of the South.
 Xolotl, god of death, associated with Venus as the Evening Star (Double of Quetzalcoatl)
 Ehecatl, god of wind
 Tlaloc, god of rain, lightning and thunder. He is a fertility god.
 Coyolxauhqui, goddess and leader of the Centzonhuitznahua, associated with the moon.
 Meztli, goddess of the moon.
 Tonatiuh, god of the sun.
 Nanahuatzin, god of the sun. He sacrificed himself in a burning fire, so the god Tonatiuh took his place.
 Centzonmimixcoa, 400 gods of the northern stars
 Centzonhuitznahua, 400 gods of the southern stars
 Tlahuizcalpantecuhtli, god of the morning star (Venus)
Lords of the Night
 Xiuhtecuhtli, god of fire and time
 Tezcatlipoca, god of providence, the darkness and the invisible, lord of the night, ruler of the North.
 Piltzintecuhtli, god of visions, associated with Mercury (the planet that is visible just before sunrise or just after sunset) and healing
 Centeotl, god of maize
 Mictlantecuhtli, god of the Underworld (Mictlan)
 Chalchiuhtlicue, goddess of running water, lakes, rivers, seas, streams, horizontal waters, storms, and baptism.
 Tlazolteotl, goddess of lust, carnality, and sexual misdeeds.
 Tepeyollotl, god of the animals, darkened caves, echoes, and earthquakes. Tepeyollotl is a variant of Tezcatlipoca and is associated with mountains.
 Tlaloc, god of rain, lightning and thunder. He is a fertility god.
Lords of the Day
 Xiuhtecuhtli, god of fire and time
 Tlaltecuhtli, old god/goddess of earth (changed in the landscape and atmosphere)
 Chalchiuhtlicue, goddess of running water, lakes, rivers, seas, streams, horizontal waters, storms, and baptism.
 Tonatiuh, god of the Sun
 Tlazolteotl, goddess of lust, carnality, and sexual misdeeds.
 Mictlantecuhtli, god of the Underworld (Mictlan)
 Mictecacihuatl, goddess of the Underworld (Mictlan)
 Centeotl, god of maize
 Tlaloc, god of rain, lightning and thunder. He is a fertility god.
 Quetzalcoatl, god of life, light and wisdom, lord of the winds and the day, ruler of the West.
 Tezcatlipoca, god of providence, the darkness and the invisible, lord of the night, ruler of the North.
 Tlahuizcalpantecuhtli, god of dawn (Venus)
 Citlalicue, goddess of female stars in the Milky Way.
 Citlalatonac, god of female stars (Husband of Citlalicue)
Earth deities
 Xipe-Totec, god of force, lord of the seasons and rebirth, ruler of the East.
 Tonacatecuhtli, god of sustenance associated with Ometecuhtli.
 Tonacacihuatl, goddess of sustenance associated with Omecihuatl.
 Tlaltecuhtli, old god/goddess of earth (changed in the landscape and atmosphere)
 Chicomecoatl, goddess of agriculture
 Centeotl, god of the maize associated with the Tianquiztli (Pleiades)
 Xilonen, goddess of tender maize
Matron goddesses
 Coatlicue, goddess of fertility, life, death and rebirth 
 Chimalma, goddess of fertility, life, death and rebirth
 Xochitlicue, goddess of fertility, life, death and rebirth
 Itzpapalotl, death goddess, obsidian butterfly, leader of the Tzitzimitl
 Toci, goddess of health

See also 
List of Aztec gods and supernatural beings
Santa Muerte, the Mictecacihuatl reincarnate
The Stinking Corpse
Thirteen Heavens

Bibliography 

 
 

 
 
 
 James Lewis Thomas Chalmbers Spence, The Myths of Mexico and Peru: Aztec, Maya and Inca, 1913 The Myths of Mexico and Peru: Aztec, Maya and Inca
 Miguel León Portilla, Native Mesoamerican Spirituality, Paulist Press, 1980 Native Mesoamerican Spirituality: Ancient Myths, Discourses, Stories, Doctrines, Hymns, Poems from the Aztec, Yucatec, Quiche-Maya and Other Sacred Traditions

References

External links 
, Daniel Brinton (Ed); late 19th-century compendium of some Aztec mythological texts and poems appearing in one manuscript version of Sahagun's 16th-century codices.
 Aztec history, culture and religion Bernal Díaz del Castillo, The Discovery and Conquest of Mexico (tr. by A. P. Maudsley, 1928, repr. 1965)
 Portal Aztec Mythology (in Spanish)
 

Mexican culture
Mythology
Mesoamerican mythology and religion
Latin American culture
Pre-Columbian mythology and religion